The Wancho people, also known as the Wancho Naga, are a Tibeto-Burmese indigenous ethnic group inhabiting the Patkai hills of Longding district in the Northeast Indian state of Arunachal Pradesh. Culturally Naga, they are ethnically related to the Nocte of Arunachal Pradesh and Konyak of Nagaland The Wancho and Konyak still today share similar names, Konyak is the largest ethnic group in Nagaland. Wancho's history is mostly based on present day Nagaland.Even today, There are villages in Wancho inhabited area in Arunachal and konyak inhabited Mon Nagaland with the same names for example Longkei village. . The Wancho language belongs to the Tibeto-Burman family under Northern Naga languages.

Religion 

Unlike other Naga, the Wancho, together with the Nocte and a small minority of the Konyak, still retain the belief of Animism. These Animist Wancho believe in the existence of two powerful deities, Rang and Baurang.

Christianity has gained some followers among the Wancho, many of whom belong to the Baptist or Catholic denominations. Acceptance of Christianity has largely to do with comparative influences from the Nagas of Nagaland as well as changing perspectives towards headhunting. However, this has also resulted in the decline in many aspects of their traditional culture, which has strong associations with religion.

At the 2001 census, just 10% of the Wancho were Hindu and another 16% were Animist (2.55% Hindu and 0.55% Animist as per 2011 census).

Culture 

Tattooing plays a major role among the Wancho ethnic group. According to tradition, a man is tattooed on his four limbs and his entire face, with the exception of certain regions around the eyes and the lips. The women adorn themselves with necklaces and bangles, along with some light tattooing as well.

The prime festival of the Wancho is Oriah, a festival between  March to April, for a period of six to twelve days interspersed with prayer, songs and dances. Villagers exchange bamboo tubes filled with rice beer as a mark of greeting and goodwill. Pork skin is then offered to the village chief as a mark of respect. This festival continues for several days as jhum paddies are sown, pigs, buffaloes and gayals are sacrificed, and feasts are arranged in each and every murung (dormitory). Boys and girls, wearing ceremonial costumes, sing and dance during Oriah. People dances around a "Jangban", a long ceremonial pole planted during Oriah. 16 February is celebrated as the Wancho Oriah festival each year.

Lifestyle 

The Wancho are traditionally governed by a council of elderly chieftains, known as Wangham or Wangsa.

Like most neighbouring ethnic groups, the Wancho construct houses made out of wood and bamboo, and roofs were thatched with dry leaves. Dormitories, known as murung, are structures where the boys are trained to be men by their fathers. Although the girls do not have dormitories like the boys, they sleep in one big, single house, with the care of an old lady.

Until 1991, human headhunting was practiced among the Naga people, and both the government and missionaries have taken steps to ban the practice of headhunting, which is now restricted to animals.

References

External links 

 Ethnologue profile
 Arts - Wood carving
 Eine Reise durch das südliche Arunachal

Tribes of Arunachal Pradesh
Naga people
Tirap district
People from Longding district
Headhunting